In mathematics, the additive polynomials are an important topic in  classical algebraic number theory.

Definition
Let k be a field of prime characteristic p. A polynomial P(x) with coefficients in k is called an additive polynomial, or a Frobenius polynomial, if 

as polynomials in a and b. It is equivalent to assume that this equality holds for all a and b in some infinite field containing k, such as its algebraic closure. 

Occasionally absolutely additive is used for the condition above, and additive is used for the weaker condition that P(a + b) = P(a) + P(b) for all a and b in the field. For infinite fields the conditions are equivalent, but for finite fields they are not, and the weaker condition is the "wrong" as it does not behave well. For example, over a field of order q any multiple P of xq − x will satisfy P(a + b) = P(a) + P(b) for all a and b in the field, but will usually not be (absolutely) additive.

Examples 
The polynomial xp is additive. Indeed, for any a and b in the algebraic closure of k one has by the binomial theorem

  

Since p is prime,  for all n = 1, ..., p−1 the binomial coefficient  is divisible by p, which implies that 

 

as polynomials in a and b.

Similarly all the polynomials of the form

are additive, where n is a non-negative integer.

The definition makes sense even if k is a field of characteristic zero, but in this case the only additive polynomials are those of the form ax for some a in k.

The ring of additive polynomials
It is quite easy to prove that any linear combination of polynomials  with coefficients in k is also an additive  polynomial. An interesting question is whether there are other additive  polynomials except these linear combinations. The answer is that these are the only ones.

One can check that if P(x) and M(x) are  additive polynomials, then so are P(x) + M(x) and P(M(x)). These imply that the  additive polynomials form a ring under polynomial addition and composition. This ring is denoted 

This ring is not commutative unless k is the field  (see modular arithmetic). Indeed, consider the additive polynomials ax and xp for a coefficient a in k. For them to commute under composition, we must have

and hence ap − a = 0.  This is false for a not a root of this equation, that is, for a outside

The fundamental theorem of additive polynomials
Let P(x) be a polynomial with coefficients in k, and  be the set of its roots. Assuming that the roots of P(x) are distinct (that is, P(x) is separable), then P(x) is additive if and only if the set  forms a group with the field addition.

See also
Drinfeld module
Additive map

References
 David Goss, Basic Structures of Function Field Arithmetic, 1996, Springer, Berlin. .

External links

Algebraic number theory
Modular arithmetic
Polynomials